Ngā Manu Kōrero is a speech competition for secondary students that encourages fluency in te reo Māori and English.

History 
The contest began in 1965 as the Korimako Speech Contest. Sir Bernard Fergusson donated a trophy to encourage greater English fluency in Māori students. School and regional competitions were organised by the Post Primary Teachers' Association and Māori Education Foundation (now Māori Education Trust) with a national final in August 1965. 

In 1977, the Pei Te Hurinui Jones Contest was added for senior Māori oratory. Three years later, a junior English section was introduced, with a taonga for the section provided by Ngāti Kahungunu ki Te Tairoa in memory of SIr Turi Carroll, and three years after that, the junior Māori oratory section, Rāwhiti Īhaka, was added. 

In 1987, after considerable growth in the competition, it was renamed 'Ngā Whakataetae mō Ngā Manu Kōrero o Ngā Tuarua', generally shortened to Ngā Manu Kōrero. 

In 2020, the competition was cancelled due to the Covid-19 pandemic. In 2021, it was moved online.

Divisions 
The competition has four divisions:

Pei Te Hurinui Jones Contest 
Named in honour of Dr Pei Te Hurinui Jones, a Waikato elder and scholar who died in 1976, this section is for senior students and consists of two speeches in te reo Māori, one prepared and the other impromptu.

Te Rāwhiti Ihaka Contest 
Named in honour of Rāwhiti Ihaka, a skilled orator and teacher at St Stephens School, this section is for junior students and consists of one prepared speech in te reo Māori.

Korimako Contest 
The Korimako Contest is for senior Māori students and consists of a prepared and an impromptu speech in English.

Sir Turi Carroll Contest 
Named in honour of Sir Turi Carroll, Ngāti Kahanungu leader and orator, this section is for junior Māori students and consists of a prepared speech in English.

References

Māori language